Keith Barrie Baskin (born 15 December 1945) is a former Australian rules footballer who represented  in the Victorian Football League (VFL) during the 1960s and 1970s. He is one of few Jewish Australian rules footballers to have played at the top level.

The centreman crossed to South Melbourne in 1964 after Moorabbin was suspended by the Victorian Football Association (VFA). He initially moved to Sandringham, before deciding to try to break into league ranks with South. He stayed with South Melbourne for one season, before going to Myrtleford in the Ovens & Murray Football League.

He returned to South in 1967 and came third in the best and fairest count the following season.

In 1974 he spent a season as coach of VFA club Mordialloc.

References

External links

1945 births
Living people
Australian rules footballers from Victoria (Australia)
Sydney Swans players
Moorabbin Football Club players
Myrtleford Football Club players
Mordialloc Football Club players
Mordialloc Football Club coaches
Australian Jews
Jewish sportspeople